Johann Ludwig (8 June 1903 – 7 January 1985) was a German international footballer.

References

1903 births
1985 deaths
Association football forwards
German footballers
Germany international footballers
Holstein Kiel players